Craugastor lauraster is a species of frog in the family Craugastoridae.
It is found in Honduras and Nicaragua.
Its natural habitats are subtropical or tropical moist lowland forests, subtropical or tropical moist montane forests, and heavily degraded former forest.
It is threatened by habitat loss.

References

Lauraster
Amphibians of Honduras
Amphibians of Nicaragua
Frogs of North America
Endangered fauna of North America
Amphibians described in 1996
Taxonomy articles created by Polbot